KPZ may refer to:

 Kardar–Parisi–Zhang equation, a non-linear stochastic partial differential equation
 Kupsabiny language (ISO 639-3: kpz), a Kalenjin language of eastern Uganda.
 Main Battle Tank, a designation given to several German main battle tanks
 Zenica prison, Bosnia and Herzegovina

See also